Bang Khu Wiang is one of the nine subdistricts (tambon) of Bang Kruai District, in Nonthaburi Province, Thailand. The subdistrict is bounded by (clockwise from north) Bang Muang, Bang Len, Bang Krang, Bang Khun Kong, Maha Sawat and Plai Bang subdistricts. In 2020 it had a total population of 10,747 people.

Administration

Central administration
The subdistrict is subdivided into 7 administrative villages (muban).

Local administration
The whole area of the subdistrict is covered by Plai Bang Subdistrict Municipality.

References

External links
Website of Plai Bang Subdistrict Municipality

Tambon of Nonthaburi province
Populated places in Nonthaburi province